Fouad M'Roudjaé (born 24 June 1994) is a Comorian international footballer who plays for Marseille, as a left back.

Career
M'Roudjaé has played club football for Marseille.

He made his international debut for Comoros in 2014.

References

1994 births
Living people
Comorian footballers
Comoros international footballers
French footballers
French sportspeople of Comorian descent
Olympique de Marseille players
Association football fullbacks